Eugenia Levi (21 November 1861 – 1915) was an Italian author, translator, and journalist. Born to a Jewish family in Padua, she was educated in that city, as well as in Florence and Hanover. In 1885 she was appointed professor at the R. Istituto superiore femminile di Magistero in Florence.

Publications

  (5th ed. 1899). Anthology of Italian prosaists and poets from Dante Alighieri to Giosuè Carducci.
  (3rd ed. 1903).
 
 
  (3rd ed. 1898). A collection of quotations from Dante.
  (3rd ed. 1900).
  Anthology of traditional Italian songs.
  Grammar of the German language with a translation of standard German works.

References
 

1861 births
1915 deaths
19th-century Italian journalists
19th-century Italian translators
19th-century Italian women writers
20th-century Italian journalists
20th-century Italian women writers
German–Italian translators
Italian women journalists
Jewish Italian writers
Jewish journalists
Jewish translators
Jewish women writers
19th-century women journalists